São Fidélis is a municipality located in the Brazilian state of Rio de Janeiro. Its population was 38,710 (2020) and its area is 1,028 km2.

The municipality contains part of the  Desengano State Park, created in 1970.

References

Municipalities in Rio de Janeiro (state)